Anatoly Vasiliyevich Kvashnin (15 August 1946 – 7 January 2022) was a Russian military officer, who served as the Chief of the General Staff of Russian Armed Forces from 1997 to 2004, when he was dismissed by President Vladimir Putin. In the period 2004–2010, he was the Plenipotentiary Representative of the President of Russia in the Siberian Federal District.

Military career
Kvashnin graduated from the Kurgan Machine Building Institute with specialist degree in engineering and the military department of this institute in 1969, received his officer commission as a lieutenant. He was drafted into active duty in July of the same year. He began serving in the army as deputy commander of a tank company in the 201st Motor Rifle Division. In July 1971, after the ending of his conscript military service, he decided to stay in armed forces as a volunteer and served until his discharge in 2004.

In 1973, Kvashnin enrolled in the Malinovsky Tank Academy. After graduating three years later, Kvashnin became chief of staff of the 360th Tank Regiment of the 18th Guards Motor Rifle Division in June 1976, stationed in Czechoslovakia under the Central Group of Forces. He steadily rose to higher positions in Czechoslovakia, becoming regimental commander of the 360th in August 1978 and chief of staff of the 31st Tank Division of the group in February 1981. Kvashnin was promoted to command the 78th Tank Division of the Central Asian Military District in July 1982, and in 1987 was sent to the Soviet General Staff Academy for advanced studies.

After graduating from the academy in 1989, he was appointed deputy commander of the 28th Combined Arms Army in July of that year. In August 1992, he became deputy chief of the Main Operative Directorate of the General Staff of the Armed Forces of the Russian Federation. Since February 1993, Kvashnin was first deputy chief of the Main Operative Directorate of the General Staff of the Armed Forces of the Russian Federation.

During First Chechen War, Kvashnin took command of the Joint Grouping of Russian Forces in Chechnya in December 1994 following the relief of Colonel General Alexey Mityukhin for the initial Russian defeats, and remained in this position until 31 January 1995. In February 1995, he replaced Mityukhin as the commander of the North Caucasus Military District.

On 19 June 1997, Anatoly Kvashnin was appointed to the position of the Chief of the General Staff of Russian Armed Forces. On 25 November 1997, he was promoted to the military rank of Army general. For leading the Russian operational headquarters directing operations against Chechen fighters during the 1999 Dagestan war, Kvashnin was made a Hero of the Russian Federation.

As Chief of the Russian General Staff he had some success in reforming the command structure for the strategic deterrent forces, but feuded with Defence Minister Sergei Ivanov and many of his subordinates. Kvashnin also proved to be indecisive at times, he split then merged the Volga-Urals Military District, combined the Strategic Rocket Forces with the Russian Space Forces and the Early Warning System, then restored their independence.

On 10 June 2000, Kvashnin became a member of the Security Council of Russia.

On 19 July 2004, Anatoly Kvashnin was released from the post of the Chief of the General Staff of Russian Armed Forces. On 9 September 2004, Kvashnin was honorably discharged from military service. He was listed in the inactive reserve until 2011 when he became a retired army general.

Later life and death 
On 9 September 2004, Kvashnin was appointed to the post of the President's Plenipotentiary Representative in the Siberian Federal District thus becoming a civilian official. On 20 December 2004, Kvashnin was promoted to the civilian service rank of 1st class Active State Councillor of the Russian Federation. On 9 September 2010, he was released from the post of the President's Plenipotentiary Representative in the Siberian Federal District and was honorably discharged from civilian service. On 20 September 2010, Kvashnin ceased to be a member of the Security Council of Russia.

Kvashnin held a candidate of sciences degree in sociological sciences (1997), a doctor of sciences degree in military sciences (2004) and was a corresponding member of the Russian Academy of Rocket and Artillery Sciences.

In the last years of his life Kvashnin lived in Novosibirsk with his family. Kvashnin died on 7 January 2022, at the age of 75, from COVID-19 during the COVID-19 pandemic in Russia. He was buried in the Federal Military Memorial Cemetery on 10 January 2022.

Honours and awards
 Hero of the Russian Federation (27 October 1999)
 Order of Merit for the Fatherland;
 2nd Class
 3rd Class (19 July 2004) – for great contribution to strengthening national defence and many years of conscientious service
 4th Class
 Order of Courage
 Order of Honour (21 August 2006) – a contribution to strengthening Russian statehood and many years of conscientious service
 Order for Service to the Homeland in the Armed Forces of the USSR
 3rd Class
 Medal "In Commemoration of the 850th Anniversary of Moscow"
 Medal of Merit in the All-Russia Census
 Jubilee Medal "In Commemoration of the 100th Anniversary since the Birth of Vladimir Il'ich Lenin"
 Medal "Veteran of the Armed Forces of the USSR"
 Medal "For development of virgin lands"
 Jubilee Medal "50 Years of the Armed Forces of the USSR"
 Jubilee Medal "60 Years of the Armed Forces of the USSR"
 Jubilee Medal "70 Years of the Armed Forces of the USSR"
 Medal "June 12, 1999 Bosnia-Kosovo" from nickel-silver for Number 1 (2000, Russian Ministry of Defence)
 Medal "For Military Merit"
 1st Class
 Medal "For Strengthening Military Cooperation"
 Medal "For diligence in carrying out engineering tasks"
 Order of the Holy Prince Daniel of Moscow (Russian Orthodox Church, 2000)
 Officer of the National Order of the Legion of Honour (France, 2004)
 Order of the Yugoslav Star (Serbia and Montenegro, 2003–2006)
 Honorary Citizen of Makhachkala (2000)

References

External links
  Biography of Kvashnin from Renaissance Capital

1949 births
2022 deaths
Military personnel from Ufa
Military Academy of the General Staff of the Armed Forces of the Soviet Union alumni
Soviet major generals
Generals of the army (Russia)
1st class Active State Councillors of the Russian Federation
Heroes of the Russian Federation
Recipients of the Order "For Merit to the Fatherland", 2nd class
Recipients of the Order of Courage
Recipients of the Order of Honour (Russia)
Recipients of the Order of Holy Prince Daniel of Moscow
Officiers of the Légion d'honneur
People of the Chechen wars
Medvedev Administration personnel
Deaths from the COVID-19 pandemic in Russia
Deputy Defence Ministers of Russia
Burials at the Federal Military Memorial Cemetery